Agent Sai Srinivasa Athreya is a 2019 Indian Telugu-language comedy thriller film directed by Swaroop R. S. J., who co-wrote the film with Naveen Polishetty. The film stars Naveen Polishetty as the title character alongside Shruti Sharma in her Telugu debut. It follows a Nellore-based detective whose life runs into danger when he starts investigating the case of a dead body abandoned near a railway track.

The film was released theatrically on 21 June 2019 and received critical acclaim from the critics, where it  became a commercial success at the box office. The film won three awards at Zee Cine Awards Telugu.

Plot 
Athreya wakes up in the middle of the night and learn about his mother Mahalakshmi's death, where he leaves for home to Nellore from his college in Bhopal, only to see Mahalakshmi has already been cremated by his uncle. 3 years later, Athreya is now a detective in Nellore under the name of Agent Sai Srinivas Athreya, where he sets up an agency named FBI (Fatima Bureau of Investigation). His assistant Sneha who, earlier was his junior in college helps him in cases. Athreya is mostly involved in solving petty cases. One day, his writer friend Sirish informs him of an unidentified body in Venkatachalam. When Athreya goes there, an arrogant CI Gautham Krishna arrests him on suspicion of murder.

In prison that night, Athreya meets a man who acknowledges himself as Maruthi Rao and tells him the story of his daughter Divya, who went missing after going to Ongole. He gives him 3 phone numbers of three people who were the last who had contacted Divya before she was supposedly murdered. Ajay, Harsha, and Vasudha. Athreya and Sneha, upon investigation based on the phone numbers, confirm that Ajay and Harsha were in Ongole the day Divya was murdered, while Vasudha cannot be traced. They follow them both all day, who go to a car rental agency, mortuary, and railroad. At the end of the day, Athreya recognizes Divya somewhere along a highway, who doesn't speak Telugu, ignoring him. Upon checking at the police station at Nellore, they find that no Maruthi Rao was transferred from the rural station in the last three days.

Upon checking at the rural station, they find that the person who had called himself Maruthi Rao is actually Gopalam. Further inquiry with the station in Ongole reveals that on the day the body found was male not female. Later, at a Dhaba, Athreya discovers Ajay was brutally murdered and he is promptly arrested as the prime suspect by the Sub-Inspector Vamsi later cops finds Drugs in his Office and starts investigation deeply. Later further investigation of Sneha and Sirish they found that even Harsha also brutally murdered leaving evidences of Athreya. Then Athreya understands that Maruthi Rao's information is a trap to set him in the murder case which is related to the unidentified body found in Venkatachalam.

Athreya gets out on bail due to CCTV footage evidence that he was in Nellore sub-Jail asking for Maruthi Rao, but he only has five more days to prove his innocence due to the overwhelming evidence against him. While Athreya and Sneha investigate for clues at Harsha's house, someone tries to kill Athreya. later he explains his theory to Vamsi who is observing his investigation from the beginning, and it's discovered that Ajay and Harsha wanted the details of Athreya after he saw him being arrested in Venkatachalam. Meanwhile, a father registers a complaint about his missing daughter, and the missing daughter is Vasudha who turns out to be dead. A frustrated Athreya shows his anguish on Gautham by addressing his carelessness, where Gautham decided to cancel Athreya's bail to present him in the court soon.

Later, Athreya catches a man nicknamed "Bobby" who has been following Athreya around, however, Bobby reveals himself as an Agent Bala Venkata Subramanya Swamy like him who runs FBI (Friends Bureau of Investigation) in Hassan, Karnataka fed with false information that Athreya is the real murderer. Athreya figures out that there is a huge conspiracy, and sees that various bodies have been dumped next to the railway track between Kakinada and Tada railway stations then Athreya understands a loop hole that Regarding of Railway rules within 72 hours no one claims the dead body the dead bodies is cremated by the Railway Authorities. He deduces that the bodies are loading in a Chennai to Delhi goods train. Using this information, Athreya sees that the bodies are loaded into the goods train at Arambakkam in Tamil Nadu.

With the help of Vamsi, Bobby, and Sneha, he goes to Arambakkam after faking his death to mislead the people following him. In Arambakkam, he catches Gopalam a former stage artist, who reveals the whole plot: someone has been taking dead bodies from Hindu families on the pretext that they are taking the bodies to Kashi, a holy place to cremate the dead, for money, and then dump them next to railroads. He also finds out that Mahalakshmi's corpse has been dumped like this too since his uncle sent Mahalakshmi's body for Kashi. After an emotional breakdown, Athreya finds out that the fingerprints of the dead man in Venkatachalam have the same fingerprints of a murderer in Gujarat, and deduces that they are stealing the fingerprints of dead bodies as well to use them in crimes. Athreya and Bobby find that the people behind this wanted to set them up so that they wouldn't find the Bethaballi Amman's (a religious NGO) talismans on the dead bodies that were supposed to be removed before the bodies are disposed.

Meanwhile, Sneha and Vamsi find that Ajay, Harsha, and Vasudha collaborated on a college project about religious crimes in India and collect the material along with their photos. Looking at the photos, Athreya realises that the dead body of Vasudha had a tattoo from childhood, while Vasudha in a picture does not. Then Athreya reveals that Vasudha and her dad are running the whole operation. Being criminology graduates Ajay, and Harsha are investigating about the unidentified dead bodies. They started their investigation from Ongole and reaches to Nellore they found the Talisman in the dead body and at the same time Athreya came across the body to investigate and got arrested, where Ajay and Harsha wants to approach Athreya for taking his service, but was too late.

Vasudha wanted to kill Ajay and Harsha and set up Athreya in a narcotics case so that nobody could trace the dead body to her, but their plan failed when Athreya proved himself innocent in court by showing the CCTV footage in prison and received bail. Vasudha comes with a new plan by killing Athreya and sets up Bobby and to divert the cops. Her father lodges a false complaint and later declares to believe she was missing and found dead like the unidentified bodies. After going to Bethaballi Amman NGO's office to find it empty, Athreya deduces that Vasudha went to Rajasthan to set up there new hideout in Karni Mata Temple where the team catches her and her father there and hands them over to the Nellore police. Athreya bids his goodbye to Bobby and he along with Sneha, visits the crematory to pay their respects to Mahalakshmi. Finally, Athreya continues his petty cases and logs heads with local police again which hints towards a sequel.

Cast 

Naveen Polishetty as Agent Sai Srinivasa Athreya a.k.a. "Seenu"
Shruti Sharma as Sneha
Shredha Rajagopalan as Vasudha 
Appaji Ambarisha Darbha as Vasudha's father
Suhas as Agent Bala Venkata Subramanya Swamy a.k.a. "Bobby"
Ram Dutt as Sub-Inspector Vamsi
Krishneswara Rao as Gopalam/Maruthi Rao
Viswanath Mandalika as CI Gautham Krishna
Prashant Yarramilli as Sirish
Kranthi Priyam as PWD officer
Suri K. Chaplin
Lavanya as Ajay's wife
Mahija as Harsha's wife
Sandeep Raj as Ajay 
Vinu Varma as Harsha

Production 

The lead actor Naveen Polishetty explained that when he was looking for some good scripts, the director Swaroop contacted him on Facebook and told him the film's title and about the protagonist. When he narrated the whole story, Polishetty agreed to do the film if they got to work together on the final version. Swaroop agreed and they met at Hyderabad, where Polishetty's 4-years of experience as a writer helped him and they together worked on the script for eight months.

The soundtrack was composed by Mark K Robin and the cinematography was handled by Sunny Kurapati. The film was produced by the Malli Raava fame Rahul Yadav Nakka.

Soundtrack 
The film's only song is "Sherlock Holmes", composed by Mark K Robin. It has two versions: one sung by Anurag Kulkarni, and another by Harika Narayan.

Release 
The film was released theatrically on 21 June 2019.

Critical reception 
Agent Sai Srinivasa Athreya received critical acclaim from the critics and audience.

Film Companion Karthik Keramulu called it the best comedy thriller of the decade. Times of India critic Neehitha Nyayapati gave it 4 stars out of 5, praising Polishetty's performance and the execution. A reviewer from The Hans India gave the film 4 stars out of 5, praising the performances, music and screenplay while criticising the slow-paced narration in the first half. A Deccan Chronicle critic similarly gave it 4 stars out of 5, calling it a "Telugu Sherlock Holmes" while praising the performances, background score and the cinematography. Krishna Sripada of The News Minute gave it 4 stars out of 5, and calling it a "textbook crime drama", praised the plot and cinematography but criticised some dubbing mismatches, Sharma's "undermined" character in the second half and editing towards the end.

The film also received appreciation from several Telugu film celebrities like director K. Raghavendra Rao and actors Allu Arjun and Varun Tej.

Box office 
Agent Sai Srinivasa Athreya performed well in the US, grossing $188,427 in six days.

Home media 
The film's satellite and digital rights were sold to Gemini TV and Amazon Prime Video.

Awards and nominations

Sequel and remakes 
Following the film's success, the makers announced the film's extension into a trilogy. The film was remade in Tamil as Agent Kannayiram, and a Malayalam remake is in development.

References

External links 
 
 Agent Sai Srinivasa Athreya on Box Office Mojo
 Agent Sai Srinivasa Athreya on Fandango
 Agent Sai Srinivasa Athreya on Atom Tickets

2010s comedy mystery films
2010s Telugu-language films
2019 films
Films about murder
Indian comedy mystery films
Indian detective films
Telugu films remade in other languages